Walter Daniels (born 1963) is an American musician and harmonica player noted for introducing the instrument into a number of styles of music not usually associated with the harmonica, including punk rock, and avant-garde free improvisation.

History
Walter Daniels was born in Chicago on June 30, 1963. Daniels became inspired to play the harmonica while in high school, when he witnessed a performance by Johnny Woods on a Public Television documentary about the blues. Harmonica players John Mayall and Paul Butterfield were later inspirations, as were Muddy Waters, Johnny Winter, and John Lee Hooker.  Early on, he moved to Austin, Texas, and attended the University of Texas where he studied music theory and tenor saxophone. While still a student at the University of Texas, Daniels became a part of the Austin music scene, and in the mid-1980s became involved with a local cowpunk band called the Hickoids, playing feedback-laden harmonica on the band's Waltz-a-Cross-Dress-Texas EP. Around this time, Daniels also contributed to an acoustic string-band called the Hokum Boys, who produced mainly old-time country music. Daniels continued on in the country music format with the Hank Street Ramblers, releasing a single on Double Naut records entitled "Got an Itch to Floss". The late 1980s saw Daniels focusing on rock music, pairing up with Austin songwriter Alejandro Escovedo in Escovedo's Buick MacKane project. Around this same time, Daniels contributed to the punk band Jack O' Fire with fellow Austin musician Tim Kerr. []

In the early 1990s, Daniels teamed up with rockabilly frontman Evan Johns in a group called the Gay Sportscasters, releasing two singles on the Only Boy label. In 1994, Daniels began performing with Big Foot Chester, where he served as bandleader, vocalist, and harmonica soloist. In 1995, Daniels went into the studio with Memphis garage-rockers the Oblivians and songwriter Jeffrey Evans, contributing harmonica to the Walter Daniels Plays With Monsieur Jeffrey Evans & The Oblivians at Melissa's Garage EP. []

During the 1990s, Daniels began employing the harmonica to experiment with free improvisation, originally on a track called "Spider Hop," released as a B-side to a single by Walter Daniels & the Gospel Clodhoppers. Daniels' free improvisation continued in collaborations with North Carolinian composer Eugene Chadbourne, avant-garde trombonist David Dove, and Houston-based, Steel Guitarist Susan Alcorn, and together in concert the group performed the music of Willie Nelson, Ernest Tubb, Bob Wills, and Austin music legend Doug Sahm. This collaboration culminated in the release of the Texas Sessions studio recording. []

Daniels continues to collaborate extensively and has worked with artists as diverse as Texacala Jones, the Hard Feelings (band), John Permenter, Hunt Sales the Leroi Brothers, Roy Loney, and Earl Poole Ball. []

Discography

As Jack O'Fire
Singles
 Bring Me The Head Of Jon Spencer 7" (Undone, 1992, UR-002)
 Clothes Make The Man 7" (Estrus, 1993, ES 743)
 She's Gone 7" (label ?, 1993, cat.no.?)
 Cool 7" (No Lie Records, 1993, NL-002)
 Wired 7" (Dishy, 1994, cat.no.?)
 O.K. Class ... Let's Review 7" (In The Red, 1994, ITR 023)
 Punkin' 7" (Estrus, 1994, ES 755)
 I'm Younger Than That Now 7" (Undone, 1994, UDR-0005-7)
 Soul Music 101 Chapter 1 7" (Sympathy for the Record Industry, 1994, SFTRI 253–1)
 Soul Music 101 Chapter 2 7" (Sympathy for the Record Industry, 1994, SFTRI 253–2)
 Soul Music 101 Chapter 3 7" (Sympathy for the Record Industry, 1994, SFTRI 253–3)
 Tiger in Your Tank 7" (label ?, year ?, cat.no.?)
 The Lost Lessons 7" (Shake Your Ass Records, 2004, SYA 008)
 The Lost Lessons 7" (Solid Sex Lovie Doll Records, 2004, SSLD 015)
 Walter Daniels & Guadalupe Plata" (2012)

Splits Albums
 Integrity, Soul, Attitude 7" (No Lie Records, 1993, NL-003)

Albums
 6 Super Shock Soul Songs 10" (Estrus, 1993, ES 102)
 Hot Rod Songs for the Soul Riot 10" (00 Records, 1993, 007)
 The Destruction Of Squaresville CD (Estrus, 1994, ES 1213)
 Soul Music 101, chapter 4 10" (Sympathy for the Record Industry, 1995, SFTRI 334)
 Forever CD (Sympathy for the Record Industry, 1996, SFTRI 405)
 Beware The Souless Cool CD (1+2 Records, 1996, 1+2 CD 059)

With the Oblivians and Monsieur Jeffrey Evans
 Walter Daniels Plays With Monsieur Jeffrey Evans & The Oblivians at Melissa's Garage 10" (Undone, 1995, UDR-0008-10)
 Melissa's Garage Revisited LP/CD (Sympathy for the Record Industry, 1999, SFTRI 590)

With the Revelators
 The Revelators Featuring Walter Daniels 7" (Sympathy for the Record Industry, 1997, SFTRI 512)

With '68 Comeback
'Singles'
 Someday My Prince Will Come .... 2x7" (Sympathy for the Record Industry, 1996, SFTRI 390)
'Albums'
 A Bridge Too Fuckin' Far 2xLP/CD (Sympathy for the Record Industry, 1998, SFTRI 422)

As Big Foot Chester
Singles
 Harpoon Man 7" (Sympathy for the Record Industry, 1996, SFTRI 419)
'Albums'
 Devil in Me CD (Sympathy for the Record Industry, 1996, SFTRI 420)
 Tabernacalin' CD (Sympathy for the Record Industry, 1998, SFTRI 520)

With The Hard Feelings (band)
 Fought Back And Lost LP/CD (Sympathy for the Record Industry, 2000, SFTRI 604)
 You Won't Like It LP/CD (Dropkick/Beerland, 2001, BEHIND19/BEER01)
 Rebels Against the Future LP/CD (Dropkick/Beerland, 2003, BEHIND28/BEER02)

As Walter Daniels and the Drunken Angels
'Singles'
 Ain' t It Grand To Be A Christian 7" (Solid Sex Lovie Doll Records, 2000, SSLD 006)

With The Crack Pipes
 Every Night, Saturday Night (Sympathy for the Record Industry, 2001, SFTRI 646)

As South Filthy
'Singles'
 Soul of a Man 7" (Wrecked Em Records, 2003, wrecked 004)
'Albums'
 You Can Name It Yo' Mammy If You Wanna ... CD (Sympathy for the Record Industry, 2002, SFTRI 701)
 Crackin' Up + You Can Name It Yo' Mammy If You Wanna 2xLP/LP (Rockin' Bones, 2005, RON 062-1/RON062-2)
 Undertakin' Daddy (Beast Records, BR-087)

With Chili Cold Blood
 Trashcan Parade (Blood Chili Records, 2005)

With Black Joe Lewis and Cool Breeze
 Boogie 7" (Shake Your Ass Records, 2005, SYA 015)

As Walter Daniels and The Gospel Clodhoppers
 Harmonica!! b/w "Take Your Foot Out of the Mud & Put It in the Sand" 7" (Ghost Highway Recordings, 2010, GHR-04)

With Harp Explosion (feat. Walter Daniels)
'Single'
 Atom Age Harmonica Blowout 7" (Noisegames Records, 2014, NGR007)

References
 http://www.ghosthighwayshop.com/es/home/621-lp-walter-daniels-the-del-valle-trustees-pre-order-out-decmeber-2021.html
 https://boredout305.tumblr.com/post/132838896693/walter-daniels-interview-part-one
 Chadbourne, Eugene. [ "Walter Daniels"] "www.allmusic.com". Retrieved June 1, 2007.
 Evert. "Walter Daniels" "www.grunnenrocks.com". Retrieved June 1, 2007.
 Walter Daniels. "Capinch Zine No. 5 – Feb.2005". Retrieved July 14, 2007.

Living people
1963 births
American harmonica players
Musicians from Texas
Musicians from Chicago
Punk blues musicians
American punk rock musicians
Country blues musicians